The Late News is a British late evening news programme that was broadcast on ITV television network on Friday at 11:00pm between 18 January 2008 to 6 March 2009. It was produced by ITN.

The thirty-minute news programme, introduced alongside a revamped News at Ten that aired from Monday to Thursday, enabled ITV to air dramas and entertainment programming past 10:00pm on Friday evenings. The Late News was initially presented by News at Ten newscasters Mark Austin and Julie Etchingham. After two months, The Late News was realigned with ITV News branding and presented by one newscaster, although continued to be introduced by continuity announcers and billed in television listings as The Late News until its demise. Following an increase in viewing figures for News at Ten, ITV cancelled The Late News on 2 March 2009 in order for the 10:00pm programme to air every weeknight at that time.

Presenters

References

External links

ITN.co.uk

2008 British television series debuts
2009 British television series endings
ITN
ITV news shows